A giant is a being of human appearance, sometimes of prodigious size and strength, common in folklore.

Giant(s) or The Giant(s) may also refer to:

Mythology and religion
Giants (Greek mythology)
Jötunn, a Germanic term often translated as 'giant'
Giants (Welsh folklore)
Giants (esotericism)
Nephilim, a Hebrew term loosely translated as 'giants' in some Bibles
List of giants in mythology and folklore

Arts and entertainment

Fictional characters
 Giants (Marvel Comics), a fictional race of people
 Giant (Dungeons & Dragons), 1974, a type of fictional character
 Judge Giant, two fictional characters in the 1977 Judge Dredd comic strip
 The Giant (Twin Peaks), an inhabitant of The Black Lodge in the 1990s television series
 Lily Duncan, also known as "Princess Giant", from the 1999 television series Mona the Vampire

Films
The Giant (1938 film), a black-and-white Japanese film
Giant (1956 film), a film adaptation of Ferber's novel
Giant (2009 film), a Uruguayan film
The Giants (2011 film), a Belgium film
The Giant (2016 film), a Swedish film
Giant (2017 film), a Basque-language Spanish film
The Giant (2019 film), a French-American film

Games
Giants: Citizen Kabuto, a 2000 third-person shooter game
Skylanders: Giants, a 2012 beat-em-up game

Literature and periodicals
 Giant, a 1952 novel by Edna Ferber
 Giants (series), a 1977 science fiction series by James P. Hogan
 "giANTS", a 1979 short story by Edward Bryant
 Giant (magazine), a 2004 American urban music magazine

Music

Albums
 Giant (Buddy Holly album), 1969
 Giants (Dizzy Gillespie album), 1971
 The Giant (Dizzy Gillespie album), 1973
 The Giants (album), by Oscar Peterson, Joe Pass, and Ray Brown, 1974
 Giant (The Woodentops album), 1986
 Giant (Herman Düne album) or the title song, 2006
 Giants (Chicane album) or the title song, 2010
 Giants (Evan Craft album) or the title song, 2012
 The Giant (Ahab album) or the title song, 2012
 Giants (The Stranglers album) or the title song, 2012
 Giants (Andreya Triana album) or the title song, 2015
 Giants, by Daniel Powter, 2018

Songs
 "Giant", by Gentle Giant from Gentle Giant, 1970
 "Giant", by Stan Rogers from Fogarty's Cove, 1977
 "Giants", by Sponge from Rotting Piñata, 1994
 "Giant", by the Matthew Good Band from Beautiful Midnight, 1999
 "Giants", by Scale the Summit from Carving Desert Canyons, 2009
 "Giant", by Vampire Weekend from Contra, 2010
 "Giants", by Josh Osho, 2012
 "Giants" (Bear Hands song), 2013
 "Giant", by Banks & Steelz from Anything But Words, 2016
 "Giants" (Lights song), 2017
 "Giants" (Take That song), 2017
 "Giant" (Calvin Harris and Rag'n'Bone Man song), 2019
 "Giants", by One Ok Rock from Eye of the Storm, 2019
 "Giants", by True Damage, a virtual hip-hop group featuring Becky G, 2019
 "Giants" (Dermot Kennedy song), 2020
 "Giant", by Song Yuqi from A Page, 2021
 "Giants", by Imagine Dragons from Mercury – Act 1, 2021

Other uses in music
 The Giant (opera), a c. 1900 opera by Sergei Prokofiev
 Giant Records (independent), formed under 1987 Dutch East India Trading
 Giant (band), a 1987 American rock band
 Giant Records (Warner), 1990, a Swedish branch of Warner Music Group
 Giant (musical), a 2009 musical adaptation of Ferber's novel

Television
 The Giants, an unproduced 1960s Doctor Who television serial
 "The Giant", a 1964 episode of The Mighty Hercules
 The Giants (TV series), a 1978 Hong Kong drama series
 "Giants" (Zoboomafoo), a 1999 episode
 Giant (TV series), a 2010 South Korean historical drama series
 "Giant" (Halt and Catch Fire), a 2014 episode

Brands and enterprises
Giant Bicycles, bicycle maker
GIANT Company Software, internet security developer
Giant Food (disambiguation)
Giant Hypermarket, a retail chain in Southeast Asia
Giant Industries, a defunct oil company and convenience store chain in the U.S. Southwest now succeeded by Speedway
Grenoble Innovation for Advanced New Technologies (GIANT), an innovation campus in Polygone Scientifique in Grenoble, France

People
 Giant Baba and Baba the Giant, two of the ring names of Japanese professional wrestler Shohei Baba (1938–1999)
 André the Giant (1946–1993), French wrestler and actor
 Giant Haystacks (1947–1998), a ring name of English professional wrestler Martin Austin Ruane (1946–1998)
 Giant Silva, a ring name of Brazilian basketball player, mixed martial arts fighter, and wrestler Paulo César da Silva (born 1963)
 Giant González, a ring name of Argentine professional wrestler Jorge González (1966–2010)
 The Giant (wrestler) (born 1972), a ring name of American wrestler Paul Wight
 Paulo da Silva (born 1980), Paraguayan football player nicknamed "Giant"

Places
Giant, Richmond, California, a former unincorporated community
Giant Forest, Sequoia National Park, California
Giant Geyser, Yellowstone National Park
Giant Mountain, New York
Giant Springs, near Great Falls, Montana

Sports

Teams

Asia
 Delhi Giants, a team in the unsanctioned Indian Cricket League
 Lotte Giants, a South Korean baseball team
 Yomiuri Giants, a Japanese baseball team

Australia
Gold Coast-Tweed Giants, a rugby league team
Goldfields Giants, a State Basketball League team
Greater Western Sydney Giants, an Australian Football League team nicknamed the "Giants"

Europe
Antwerp Giants, a Belgian basketball club
Bayer Giants Leverkusen, a German basketball club
Belfast Giants, an Irish EIHL ice hockey team
Dortmund Giants, an American football club from Dortmund, Germany
East City Giants, an American football club from Helsinki, Finland
Giants Bolzano, an American football club competing in the Italian Football League
Huddersfield Giants, an English rugby league team competing in Super League
Manchester Giants, a British Basketball League team

North America 
Jacksonville Giants, a minor league basketball team
Fort McMurray Giants, a baseball team in the Western Canadian Baseball League
New York Giants (disambiguation), in various sports and eras
New York Giants, a National Football League team
San Francisco Giants, a Major League Baseball team
Arizona League Giants, their AZL minor league affiliate
San Jose Giants, their High-A minor league affiliate
Vancouver Giants, a Western Hockey League team

Negro league baseball 
Bacharach Giants, Atlantic City, New Jersey
Chicago Giants
Chicago Columbia Giants
Chicago Union Giants
Chicago American Giants
Cleveland Giants
Cuban Giants, Trenton, New Jersey
Harrisburg Giants
Illinois Giants
Leland Giants, Chicago, Illinois
Lincoln Giants, New York City
Page Fence Giants, Adrian, Michigan
Philadelphia Giants
St. Louis Giants

Other uses in sports
Giant (gymnastics), an artistic gymnastics skill
Giants Gaming, a Spanish/European eSports team

Other uses
GIANT AntiSpyware, a software application
Giant Center, an arena in Hershey, Pennsylvania
Giant Mine, a gold mine in the Northwest Territories, Canada
Giant, callsign of Atlas Air, an airline

See also

Gas giant, a type of planet
Giant star, a type of star
Processional giant, costumed tall figures
Eddie Carmel (1936–1972), Israeli-born entertainer known as "The Jewish Giant" and "The Happy Giant"
Project Riese (German for "giant"), the code name for a construction project of Nazi Germany (1943–45)
Giant Rock, Mohave Desert, California, United States
Geant (disambiguation)